John Baptist Caryll (13 December 1713 – 7 March 1788) was the third Jacobite Baron Caryll of Durford.

Caryll was the eldest son of the Honourable John Caryll (28 December 1687 – 6 April 1718), who predeceased his father, the 2nd Baron Caryll, and his wife, Lady Mary Mackenzie, daughter of the 4th Earl of Seaforth and Lady Frances Herbert.

After succeeding his grandfather, he got into financial difficulties, as a penalised Catholic, and sold the family properties at West Grinstead and Harting, West Sussex. He entered the household in Rome of the so-called "Young Pretender", the exiled Stuart claimant, recognised by Jacobites as "King Charles III". Charles Edward Stuart appointed Caryll his Secretary of State and made him a Knight of the Thistle. Caryll returned to France in 1777 and died at Dunkirk on 7 March 1788.

References
Marquis of Ruvigny and Raineval, "The Jacobite Peerage", Edinburgh 1904

1713 births
1788 deaths
Barons in the Jacobite peerage
English Jacobites
People from Harting
People from West Grinstead